The second season of the comedy television series Modern Family aired on ABC from September 22, 2010 to May 25, 2011. The season was produced by Lloyd-Levitan Productions in association with 20th Century Fox Television, with series creators Steven Levitan and Christopher Lloyd serving as show runners. On January 12, 2010, Modern Family was renewed for a second season by ABC. Season two of Modern Family aired on Wednesday nights at 9 p.m. and consisted of 24 episodes.

The season received positive reviews from most critics, with many naming it among the best series of 2010. Despite this, the season received criticism for a sophomore slump, most notably from Alan Sepinwall. Despite the criticism, the ratings for the series rose from the previous season due to the series winning a Primetime Emmy Award for Outstanding Comedy Series. The series became the highest rated scripted program in the 18-49 demographic and the twenty-fourth most viewed program among all viewers; it was tied for being the highest rated ABC program. The series has also been nominated and won several awards including a Screen Actors Guild Award for Outstanding Performance by an Ensemble in a Comedy Series and Primetime Emmy Award for Outstanding Comedy Series, the second year in a row.

Production

Crew
The second season of the show was produced by Lloyd-Levitan Productions in association with 20th Century Fox Television and airs on the American Broadcasting Company (ABC). Modern Family is produced by co-creators Christopher Lloyd and Steven Levitan who serve as executive producers and show runners with Bill Wrubel as co-executive producer. Despite being produced by Lloyd-Levitan Productions, Steven Levitan and Christopher Lloyd dissolved their four-year business partnership. Returning writers from the first season included Paul Corrigan, Joe Lawson, Levitan, Lloyd, Dan O’Shannon, Brad Walsh, Ilana Wernick, Wrubel, and Danny Zuker. Joining the writing staff during the second season were Jerry Collins, Alex Herschlag, Abraham Higginbotham, Elaine Ko, Jeffrey Richman. Higginbotham had previously worked with Jesse Tyler Ferguson on the short lived Fox sitcom, Do Not Disturb. Returning directors are Michael Spiller and Chris Koch while new directors are Gail Mancuso, Scott Ellis and Beth McCarthy-Miller. Jason Winer, who directed 14 episodes of the first season didn't receive a credit for the season due to him directing his first film, Arthur.

Cast

Modern Family employs an ensemble cast. The series is set in Los Angeles and focuses on the family lives of Jay Pritchett (Ed O'Neill), his daughter Claire Dunphy (Julie Bowen), and his son Mitchell Pritchett (Jesse Tyler Ferguson). Claire is a homemaker mom  married to Phil Dunphy (Ty Burrell); they have three children, Haley (Sarah Hyland), the typical teenager, Alex (Ariel Winter), the smart middle child, and Luke (Nolan Gould), the offbeat only son. Jay is married to a much younger Colombian woman, Gloria (Sofía Vergara), and is helping her raise her pre-teen son, Manny (Rico Rodriguez). Mitchell and his partner Cameron Tucker (Eric Stonestreet) have adopted a Vietnamese baby, Lily (twins Ella Hiller and Jaden Hiller). The child actors were only obligated to appear in 22 episodes.

Several notable actors made guest appearances throughout the second season of Modern Family. The season featured the return of Shelley Long as DeDe Pritchett who brought a new boyfriend, Claire's ex-boyfriend who was played by Matt Dillon. Another ex-partner that appeared on the show is Mitchell's ex-girlfriend who was played by Mary Lynn Rajskub in the twelfth episode. Celia Weston also made her first appearance as Cameron's mother, Barb Tucker in the ninth episode. Nathan Lane appeared as ultra-flamboyant "friend" of Mitchell & Cameron, Pepper Saltsman. In the episode, "Earthquake", it is revealed Pepper is Cameron's ex-boyfriend. Other guest appearances included Danny Trejo played a janitor at Manny and Luke's school who is feared by many students and adds tension to Claire's relationship with Gloria in the tenth episode. James Marsden played Mitchell and Cameron's new shirtless "neighbor" in the eleventh episode. Fred Willard was originally set to return this season, but didn't for unknown reasons.

Writing

Much like the first season, much of story lines featured in episodes were based on true events that happened to the writers. For example, Phil and Claire's storyline in "Manny Get Your Gun" was based on a personal experience of executive producer Steven Levitan's in which he and his wife would debate on which way was the fastest to go home from a restaurant. The first part of the season also saw the development of Claire Dunphy, most notably in "The Old Wagon", "Halloween" and "Dance Dance Revelation". The writers also sought to respond to criticism of leveled at the near the end of the first season for the lack of physical affection exhibited by Cameron and Mitchell to each other, which spawned a Facebook campaign demanding Mitchell and Cameron be allowed to kiss. In response to the controversy, producers released a statement that a season two episode would address Mitchell's discomfort with public displays of affection. Executive producer Levitan has said that it was unfortunate that the issue had arisen, since the show's writers had always planned on such a scene "as part of the natural development of the show." The response episode, "The Kiss" was eventually written and aired during the second season and drew praise from multiple critics for the subtle nature of the kiss and became the fourth highest rated episode of the series so far. During the second season, the writers stopped using a voice over at the end of most episodes which had been criticized by some critics during the first season for being "hokey".

Episodes

Reception

Reviews

The second season reached positive reviews much like the previous season. Maureen Ryan of TV Squad named the season along with Cougar Town and Better Off Ted one of the best shows of 2010. Robert Bianco of USA Today gave the new season four stars out of four saying "Not since Frasier has a sitcom offered such an ideal blend of heart and smarts, or proven itself so effortlessly adept at so many comic variations, from subtle wordplay to big-laugh slapstick to everything in between." Robert Bianco in a later review stated "as good as it was in its first year, is even better in its second" positively comparing the characters to the characters from The Mary Tyler Moore Show, The Cosby Show and Friends. TV Squad writer Joel Keller praised the show's avoidance of the sophomore slump writing "Steve Levitan, Christopher Lloyd, and their cast and crew haven't missed a beat, churning out consistently funny episodes as if its wildly-successful first season never ended.". 

"Manny Get Your Gun" received overwhelmingly positive reviews from critics with many of them comparing it to the quality of the first-season episodes, with TV Guide writer Matt Roush calling it "comedy gold". The episode was later put in for Primetime Emmy Award for Outstanding Comedy Series along with "The Old Wagon", "The Kiss", "Caught in the Act", "Someone to Watch Over Lily" and "Mother's Day". "Halloween" also received similar reviews,  with The A.V. Club reviewer Donna Bowman comparing it to the critically acclaimed first-season episode, "Fizbo". The episode was also named the eleventh best episode of 2010 by TV Guide and was also named among the best 2010 episodes of Modern Family by The A.V. Club.

The episode, "Unplugged" received some controversy due to Gloria's line "Ah, here we go. Because, in Colombia, we trip over goats and we kill people in the street. Do you know how offensive that is? Like we’re Peruvians!" Milagros Lizarraga, founder of the online group Peru USA Southern Ca, told the Associated Press, "It’s incredible that in a country where everything is politically correct, ABC would have a line of this sort." Sofía Vergara responded to a fan asking about the script (in Spanish) "get a life".

The second season also received criticism for a "drop in quality". New York writer Rachel Muddux while reviewing "Chirp" wrote that "Modern Family feels like it's still struggling a little to live up to the Emmy-winning highs of its first, negotiating the boundaries of its family-sitcom roots and attempting to transcend cheap laughs." She later went on to say in a later review that "after three spot-on episodes in a row and nearly a month of reruns, the show kicked off its second season's second half in such fine form that we're hoping next week we won't feel at all compelled to mention how iffy things were looking there for a while.". Emily VanDerWerff of The A.V. Club while reviewing "Two Monkeys and a Panda", criticized the second season, saying that it has possibly tarnished the show's legacy as a "classic". HitFix reviewer Alan Sepinwall, who was very critical over the quality drop of the second season, received harsh comments from readers whenever he criticized an episode leading to him reviewing the series less frequently.

Eric Stonestreet's character Cameron Tucker, who was considered the best character of the first season, was mainly criticized. Sepinwall, while reviewing "The One That Got Away", wrote that Cameron had become a "whiny, overly-sensitive diva". TV Squad writer Joel Keller, while reviewing "Manny Get Your Gun", wrote that "It's just that sometimes Cam is too much Cam for his, or the audience's, own good". Despite the criticism, Ty Burrell went on to still receive praise from critics and fans alike. While the episode "Bixby's Back" received mixed reviews from critics, Burrell's performance was well received with Rachel Maddux of New York calling it "comedic mastery". Joyce Eng of TV Guide named Julie Bowen, Ed O'Neill and Nolan Gould among her dream ballot for Best Supporting Actor/Actress in a Comedy Series at the Emmy's. In a poll voted by TVLine readers, Vergara, was voted the most deserving of the Supporting Actress Award.

Awards and nominations

During its second season, Modern Family received two nominations at the 2010 Writers Guild of America Awards. Paul Corrigan and Brad Walsh were nominated for an Episodic Comedy for writing the episode, "Earthquake", but lost to Robert Carlock for his work on 30 Rock'''s "When It Rains, It Pours". The series also won Comedy Series. Modern Family garnered three nominations at the 2010 Satellite Awards for Best Television Series - Musical or Comedy. The series was also nominated for acting for Burrell and Bowen. The series went on to lose all three nominations. The series also received another Best Television Series - Musical or Comedy nomination at the 68th Golden Globe Awards for the second season in a row. The series also received a nomination for two supporting actor awards for Stonestreet and Vergara. Vergara received another acting nomination at the 17th Screen Actors Guild Awards, as did Burrell and O'Neill with the cast winning Ensemble in a Comedy. The series also won Best Comedy Series at the 2010 Producers Guild of America Awards, and tied with Glee for the Outstanding Comedy Series accolade at the 22nd GLAAD Media Awards. Michael Spiller also received a Directors Guild of America Award for Comedy Series at the 2010 ceremony, the series second win in the category. During the second season, Adweek named the show one of the 100 Most Influential TV Shows (98th chronologically).

At the inaugural Comedy Awards, the season received awards for Best Comedy Series and Comedy Directing - TV. The series was also nominated for Comedy Writing - TV and Ty Burrell for Comedy Actor - TV. In June 2011, Modern Family was nominated for six of the inaugural Critics’ Choice Television Awards. The show itself was nominated for "Best Comedy Series" while Burrell, O'Neill, and Stonestreet were nominated for "Best Supporting Actor in a Comedy Series" while Bowen and Vergara are nominated for "Best Supporting Actress in a Comedy Series". The series won while Burrell, O'Neill and Stonestreet lost their nominated to Neil Patrick Harris of How I Met Your Mother while Bowen and Vergara lost to Busy Philipps of Cougar Town. Burrell received another acting nomination for Individual Achievement in Comedy at the TCA Awards his second nomination for the award and his first time winning. The series also received a TCA Award for Outstanding Achievement in Comedy, the second win for the series in a row. 

The series also received 17 Emmy nominations including Outstanding Comedy Series, Outstanding Supporting Actor in a Comedy Series and Supporting Actress in a Comedy Series. The series received the third-most number of nominations for the year behind Mad Men and Boardwalk Empire. It later won five Emmys for Outstanding Comedy Series, Supporting Actor, Supporting Actress, Writing for a Comedy Series and Directing for a Comedy Series, all of which except for the latter were for the second win in a row. The season was also included on multiple top ten lists for best series of 2010 including: 1st on MSNBC's Top 10 TV shows of 2010, 2nd on Pastes 20 Best TV Shows of 2010, 2nd on Matt Roush's Top 10 TV, 8th on Metacritic's 2010 Television Critic Top Ten Lists, 8th Best TV Series of 2010, 13th on The A.V. Club's 25 best television series of 2010, American Film Institute's Top TV Shows of 2010, and Maureen Ryan's The Best TV of 2010: Top 10 Roster.

 Ratings 
Like the previous season, Modern Family aired Wednesday at 9:00pm and is coupled with Cougar Town. Aided by winning the Primetime Emmy Award for Outstanding Comedy Series the show's second season became the highest rated show on Wednesday on premiere week and also rose 34% from the previous season among adults between the ages of 18 and 49. "The Old Wagon", the season premiere, finished 5th in the rating with a 5.1 rating among adults between the ages of 18 and 49. "Halloween", which was broadcast on October 27, was the highest rated episode of the season, finishing second with a 5.1 among adults between the ages of 18 and 49. "Bixby's Back" later tied with "Halloween" and "The Old Wagon" and finished fourth in the weekly ratings. The lowest rated episode of the season was "Mother Tucker", which was viewed by an estimated 10.53 million households with a 3.7 rating/12% share among 18- to 49-year-olds, which much like "Fizbo", might have received a drop due to airing on Thanksgiving Eve. The success of the series has led to the series being used as a "launch pad" to three ABC series, Cougar Town (which premiered the same season as MF), Mr. Sunshine and Happy Endings, with Mr. Sunshine being the only one not to be renewed.  The second season ranked 24th among overall viewers and fifth among viewers between the ages of 18 and 49. The season averaged 11.76 million viewers in the seasonal 18–49 demographic ratings with an average of 4.8 rating/12% share in the demographic meaning that the season was watched by an average of 4.8% of households and 12% average of all televisions were tuned to the season when it was broadcast. Added with Digital video recorder viewers, the season received a 6.2 rating in the 18-49 demographic, adding a 1.7 rating to the original viewership beating its closest competition, Glee, by six-tenths of a point.

Home video release
The second season of Modern Family'' was released on DVD in a three-disc set on September 20, 2011. The box-set contains all 24 episodes and include Deleted Family Interviews, Deleted and Extended Scenes, the "Strangers on a Treadmill" Table Read, Mitch's Flash Mob, the "Imagine Me Naked" Music Video and a Blooper Reel, Modern Family Holidays, "Waiting for Oprah", Chatting with Steven Levitan, and At Home with Modern Family.

References

External links
 Episode recaps at ABC.com
 

Modern Family (season 2) episodes
2010 American television seasons
2011 American television seasons
2